La Collá (previously La Collada) is a parish (administrative division) in Siero, a municipality within the province and autonomous community of Asturias, in northern Spain.

The population is 237 (INE 2007). The postal code is 33519.

Villages and hamlets
La Collatrás (previously Atrás)
Ceñal
Fresno (previously El Fresno)
Güergu (previously Huergo)

References

Parishes in Siero